Dayton Dutch Lions is an American soccer team based in Dayton, Ohio, United States. Founded in 2009, the team plays in USL League Two, the fourth tier of the American Soccer Pyramid. From 2011 to 2014, the team played in the USL Professional Division (USL Pro).

The team plays its home games at the Dayton Outpatient Center Stadium on the campus of West Carrollton High School in nearby West Carrollton, Ohio. The team's colors are orange, white and blue.

History
The club was started in the fall of 2009 and co-owned by Erik Tammer of Tammer Sportmanagement and Mike Mossel of Business and Sports Performance. Tammer is a former professional soccer player in the Netherlands who played for clubs such as Heerenveen and Sparta Rotterdam, while Mossel played in Europe for RBC Roosendaal and Turnhout, and in the USL for the Cincinnati Riverhawks following his graduation from Xavier University.

The team played its first competitive game on May 8, 2010, a 3–3 tie with the Cincinnati Kings. The first goal in franchise history was scored by Eddie Hertsenberg.

On July 8, 2010 the Lions announced that they would be self-promoting to the USL Second Division for the 2011 season, as well as adding a brand new women's team in the USL W-League. During the announcement team owner Mike Mossel said "The promotion to USL-2 and development of a W-League club was just a matter of time. To be the best, we must begin to play among the upper-echelon clubs. We want to set a standard, and I believe we have done that so far in the PDL in our first season. But more importantly, our decision was made with our Premier Academy in mind.". With the merger of the USL First and Second Divisions to form USL Pro in 2011, the Dutch Lions were announced as a founding team.

In 2012, the Lions reached the Quarterfinals of the 2012 Lamar Hunt U.S. Open Cup, where they defeated the MLS Columbus Crew 2–1 in the third round, then defeated the Michigan Bucks in the fourth round in extra time. They were knocked out of the tournament in the quarterfinals by eventual champions Sporting Kansas City 3–0 in front of an away record 15,167 fans.

In 2013, the Lions reached the USL Pro Playoffs for the first time with a record of 10 Wins, 7 Ties and 9 Losses. They lost to the Richmond Kickers 1–0 in the quarter-finals. Gibson Bardsley received Second Team All-League Honors with 9 goals and 7 assists.

In 2014, the Lions partnered with West Carrollton City Schools and Dr. Suresh Gupta of the Dayton Outpatient Center to install a new playing surface in the West Carrollton High School Stadium as part of a 30-year deal. The original stadium was renamed to the Dayton Outpatient Center Stadium in recognition of the significant investment made by Dayton Outpatient Center.

Renovations started on March 10, 2014, and were completed with a ribbon-cutting ceremony on May 9, 2014. The Motz Group, a Cincinnati-based company that specializes in building playing fields, replaced the existing grass field with artificial turf at a cost of $450,000 to $475,000. The combined costs for the renovations to the stadium and installation of lights on practice fields are estimated at $529,000.

The opening match at DOC Stadium, with the presence of 2-Time FIFA World Player of the Year Ruud Gullit, was a United Soccer League professional soccer game on May 10, 2014 that saw the Dayton Dutch Lions tie the LA Galaxy II, 1–1. A home record attendance of 1,527 was announced.

In 2018, the Lions had a record-setting season, matching its best record ever, winning the Great Lakes Division championship and earning qualification for the 2019 U.S. Open Cup.

Stadium
Miami Valley South Stadium; Bellbrook, Ohio (2010–2012)
Beavercreek High School Stadium; Beavercreek, Ohio (2013–2014)
Dayton Outpatient Center Stadium; West Carrollton, Ohio (2014–present)

Club culture, kits, sponsors and supporters

International partnership
On January 17, 2011, the Dutch Lions signed a five-year contract with Dutch Eredivisie champions, FC Twente, to foster development of players, academy teams, training practices, and possibly facilitate loans or transfers of players between the two teams.

Domestic partnership
Additional Dutch Lions clubs have been added over the years and partner with Dayton in branding, best practices and player considerations.

In the 2011, the Houston Dutch Lions were added (joined NPSL in 2016). In the 2014, the Cincinnati Dutch Lions were added (joined the PDL). In 2015, the Florida Gulf Coast Dutch Lions were added. In 2016, the New York Dutch Lions were added.

On December 19, 2013, the Columbus Crew of Major League Soccer announced an affiliation with the Dutch Lions which would begin with the 2014 season. The affiliation meant the opportunity for loans between the two which aim ultimately to improve the quality of play at both clubs. After the Crew's 2014 opener against D.C. United, the Club announced it was sending 5 of its players on loan to the Dutch Lions for the season, including 2013 draft pick, forward Ryan Finley.

Youth Partnerships 
The Dutch Lions Group's brand statement is "Gateway to Professional Soccer" and the purported goal of the Dutch Lions' program is to develop youth and amateur players into professional players. The Dutch Lions FC's holding company, Dutch Lions Group USA LLC, maintains a youth academy in connection with the Dutch Lions. The Ohio-based youth academy previously reported membership numbers as high as 200 players. The youth academy partners with the Ohio Galaxies FC to develop youth talent.

Kit maker / jersey sponsors
2010: Jems Sportswear Inc.  . . . .Primary Sponsor ~ Scout for All. . . . . . . . . . . . . . . . . .(Back - Coolidge Wall Co, L.P.A. & Sleeve - Courtyard Marriott & Dayton Outpatient Center)
2011: Under Armour. . . . . . . . . . Primary Sponsor ~ Scout for All. . . . . . . . . . . . . . . . . .(Back - Coolidge Wall Co, L.P.A. & Sleeve - Courtyard Marriott & Dayton Outpatient Center)
2012: Umbro. . . . . . . . . . . . . . . . Primary Sponsor ~ Scout for All. . . . . . . . . . . . . . . . . .(Back - Coolidge Wall Co, L.P.A. & Sleeve - Crowne Plaza & I Love Stroop Waffles)
2013: LA One. . . . . . . . . . . . . . . Primary Sponsor ~ Dayton Outpatient Center . . . . . . .(Back - Coolidge Wall Co, L.P.A. & Sleeve - Crowne Plaza & Mike-sell's)
2014: Nike . . . . . . . . . . . . . . . . . Primary Sponsor ~ Kettering Health Network . . . . . . .(Back - Coolidge Wall Co, L.P.A. & Sleeve - Crowne Plaza & Mike-sell's)
2015: Nike . . . . . . . . . . . . . . . . . Primary Sponsor ~ Kettering Health Network . . . . . . .(Back - Coolidge Wall Co, L.P.A. & Sleeve - Crowne Plaza & Mike-sell's)
2016: Nike . . . . . . . . . . . . . . . . . Primary Sponsor ~ Coca-Cola. . . . . . . . . . . . . . . . . . .(Back - ALT Architecture Inc. & Sleeve - Piada & Mike-sell's)
2017: Nike . . . . . . . . . . . . . . . . . Primary Sponsor ~ Coca-Cola. . . . . . . . . . . . . . . . . . .(Back - ALT Architecture Inc. & Sleeve - Piada & Mike-sell's)
2018: Geco Sportswear Inc. . . . .Primary Sponsor ~ Coca-Cola. . . . . . . . . . . . . . . . . . .(Sleeve - Dayton Outpatient Center)

Supporters group
The main supporters of the Dutch Lions are the Oranje Legion.

Owners, staff and players

Ownership

 Majority Owner - Dr. Suresh Gupta (2013)
 Minority Owner - 5 River Investments (2012)
 Minority Owner - Dutch Lions Capital Group (2009)

Soccer staff

 USL2 Head Coach - Sid van Druenen
 Assistant coach - TBA
 WPSL Head Coach - TBA
 Assistant coach - TBA

Head coaches
 Sonny Silooy (2010)
 Ivar van Dinteren (2011–2012)
 Patrick Bal (2013)
 Sid van Druenen (2013–2014)
 Matt Weston (2014)
 Patrick Bal (2015)
 Sid van Druenen (2016)
 Marcus Rixon (2017)
 Dan Griest (2018–2020)
 Sid van Druenen (2021)
 Hans Pascoal (2022-)

Current roster

Notable Former Professional, Amateur and Academy Players 
 Amass Amankona selected as the #46 pick (Round 3, Pick 5) at the 2016 MLS SuperDraft by Real Salt Lake; signed in 2018 by Indy Eleven USL PRO team.
 Rose Lavelle selected as the #1 pick (Round 1, Pick 1) at the 2017 NWSL College Draft by the Boston Breakers; signed in 2017 by the Breakers. Currently with Washington Spirit.
 Stefan Cleveland selected as the #26 pick (Round 2, Pick 4) at the 2017 MLS SuperDraft by Chicago Fire; signed in 2017 by the Fire.
 Chris Froschauer selected as the #43 pick (Round 3, Pick 2) at the 2016 MLS SuperDraft by Colorado Rapids; signed in 2017 by the Rapids.
 Emillie Fillion signed in 2013 by FC Twente in the BeNe League in the Netherlands winning the championship; signed 2014 by MSV Duisburg (women) in the Frauen Bundesliga in Germany.
 Brittany Persaud signed in 2012 by ADO Den Haag in the BeNe League in the Netherlands ; signed 2013 by Alkmaar in the same league in the Netherlands .
 George Davis IV signed in 2011 by Dayton Dutch Lions; played USL PRO for Los Angeles Blues, Orlando City SC, Richmond Kickers and currently with Louisville City FC.
 Kyle Segebart signed in 2011 by Dayton Dutch Lions; signed in 2012 by Team Wellington in the ASB Premiership in New Zealand.
 Julius Willie signed in 2011 by AGOVV Apeldoorn in the Eerste Divisie in the Netherlands; signed 2011-12 by Dayton Dutch Lions.
 Evan Schwartz signed in 2011 by Dayton Dutch Lions; signed by Knattspyrnufélagið Víkingur in the Úrvalsdeild in Iceland.
 Bret Jones signed in 2011 by Dayton Dutch Lions.
 Eric Kissinger signed in 2011 by Dayton Dutch Lions.
  Sébastien Thurière is a Haitian footballer who played for the Dutch Lions in 2014. He last played for Penang in Malaysia Premier League.

Record

Overall (56-87-45)
22-53-27 in USL PRO League Matches     (0-1-0 Playoffs)
27-27-18 in USL PDL League Matches     (0-1-0 Playoffs)
 7- 5 -0 in US OPEN CUP Matches

Year-by-year

Rank = Rank in the league; P = League Played; W = Win; D = Draw; L = Loss; GF = Goals for; GA = Goals against; GD = Goal difference; Pts = Points; Playoffs = USL Pro Playoffs; Open Cup = Lamar Hunt US Open Cup.
— = Did not Qualify; 1R = 1st round; 2R = 2nd round; 3R = 3rd round; 1/8 = Round of sixteen; CSF = Conference Semifinals; QF = Quarterfinals; SF = Semifinals; F = Final.

Top goal scorers in USL PRO

Top assists in USL PRO

Top appearances in USL Pro

Average attendance
Attendance stats are calculated by averaging each team's self-reported home attendances from the historical match archive at https://web.archive.org/web/20100105175057/http://www.uslsoccer.com/history/index_E.html

2010: 1,274 (6th in PDL)
2011: 560 (USL Pro -only 9 games reported attendance, average taken from those)
2012: 716 (10th in USL Pro)
2013: 699 (USL Pro -only 10 of 14 games reported attendance, average taken from those)
2014: 533 (14th in USL Pro)
2015: 411 (PDL Great Lakes Division)
2016: 552 (PDL Great Lakes Division)
2017: 447 (PDL Great Lakes Division)
2018: 458 (PDL Great Lakes Division)

See also 
Cincinnati Dutch Lions
Florida Gulf Coast Dutch Lions
Miami Dutch Lions

References

External links

USL League Two Page

 
Association football clubs established in 2009
USL League Two teams
Soccer clubs in Ohio
2009 establishments in Ohio
Former USL Championship teams
Sports in Dayton, Ohio
Dutch Lions FC